The Soan gecko (Cyrtopodion indusoani ) is a species of gecko, a lizard in the family Gekkonidae. The species is endemic to Pakistan.

Etymology
The specific name, indusoani, refers to two rivers, the Indus and the Soan, near the confluence of which the holotype specimen was collected.

Geographic range
C. indusoani is found in Punjab Province, Pakistan.

References

Further reading
Bauer, Aaron M.; Masroor, Rafaqat; Titus-McQuillan, James; Heinicke, Matthew P.; Daza, Juan D.; Jackman, Todd R. (2013). "A preliminary phylogeny of the Palearctic naked-toed geckos (Reptilia: Squamata: Gekkonidae) with taxonomic implications". Zootaxa 3599 (4): 301–324.
Khan MS (1988). "A new cyrtodactylid lizard from northwestern Punjab, Pakistan". Journal of Herpetology 22 (2): 241–243. (Cyrtodactylus indusoani, new species).

Cyrtopodion
Reptiles described in 1988